The Great Smokey Roadblock is a 1977 comedy road film written and directed by John Leone. It stars Henry Fonda, Eileen Brennan, John Byner, Dub Taylor, and Daina House. The film is also known as The Goodbye Run and The Last of the Cowboys.

Plot
While in a Los Angeles hospital, 60-year-old truck driver Elegant John (Henry Fonda) gets his truck repossessed by a finance company.

Deciding that it is time to make one last perfect cross-country run, he escapes from the hospital and steals back his truck. His first stop is a diner where he is well remembered. He picks up Beebo a hitch-hiker (Robert Englund) heading to Florida and says he can take him as far as Las Vegas.

Meanwhile in a Wyoming whorehouse MadaM Penelope entertains various men. However, one is an undercover cop and the place is given 48 hours to close down.

John finds it impossible to get a load as firms checking his vehicle have it listed as stolen. John then visits his old friend, Madam Penelope (Eileen Brennan), he picks up six prostitutes (Daina House, Susan Sarandon, Melanie Mayron, Leigh French, Mews Small, and Valerie Curtin) to bring them across the state border, heading for Kansas City. He heads off into the night with the police on his tail.

En route they are ambushed by Harley Davidson, a renegade country cop who throws them all in jail and awaits the photographers for his moment of fame. The girls strip naked and lure the sheriff and his deputy into the cell then all escape. They reach Missouri and drop into another diner where they all know him.

In the next diner a TV news programme discusses their flight from the law and shows much sympathy. They encounter a "duck toucher" and his journalist friend. The journalist gives them radio time and encourages them to run the growing blockade, naming them "Elegant John and the Sweet Mystery Six". They gather a cavalcade of vehicles trailing after their truck. They smash their way through the blockade which has been set up on a bridge.

John's illness starts to kick in and Beebo takes over the driving.

Cast

Henry Fonda as John Howard known as "Elegant John"
Eileen Brennan as Penelope
Austin Pendleton as Guido
Robert Englund as Beebo Crozier
Dub Taylor as Harley Davidson
John Byner as Bobby Apples
Susan Sarandon as Ginny
Melanie Mayron as Lula
Leigh French as Glinda
Mews Small as Alice C. Smith
Daina House as Celeste
Gary Sandy as Charlie La Pere
Valerie Curtin as Mary Agnes
Johnnie Collins III as Jimmy
Bibi Osterwald as Annie McCarigle

Production
The Great Smokey Roadblock was filmed in Oroville, California. Fonda suffered  from a number of illnesses during filming.

Release
The film debuted at the May 1977 Cannes Film Festival as The Last of the Cowboys. Dimension Pictures acquired distribution rights and re-edited the film against Fonda's wishes and retitled the film. The Great Smokey Roadblock was previewed on February 3, 1978 in Texas and had its premiere in Cincinnati on April 12, 1978 before opening in other states.

References

External links

1977 films
1970s chase films
1977 comedy films
1970s comedy road movies
American chase films
American comedy road movies
Films scored by Craig Safan
Trucker films
1977 directorial debut films
Dimension Pictures films
1970s English-language films
1970s American films